Gabriel Pereira de Castro (1571-1632) was a Portuguese priest, lawyer and poet.

Biography 
Gabriel Pereira de Castro was born in Braga on 7 February 1571. He became a priest there. Then he studied law at the University of Coimbra. Later he was a professor there. He died on 18 October 1632 in Lisbon.

Works 
Gabriel Pereira de Castro wrote some books about law. He is however known chiefly for his epic poem Ulisseia ou Lisboa Edificada (Ulisseia or Lisbon Built). It consists of ten books and is written in ottava rima. Its form is typical for Renaissance epic poems. The poem imitates The Lusiads by Luís Vaz de Camões. It is about the founding of the town of Lisbon by Ulysses (Odysseus). The book was published posthumously by poet's brother Luís Pereira de Castro in 1636. He wrote poems in Latin and Spanish, too. Ulisseia is considered to be one of the most significant Portuguese epic after Camões.

References

External links 
 Fragments of Ulisseia ou Lisboa Edificada in Portuguese.

1571 births
1632 deaths
Portuguese poets
17th-century Latin-language writers
Spanish-language poets
Portuguese male poets
People from Braga
Spanish-language writers from Portugal